Freddie Spencer Burns (born 13 May 1990) is an English professional rugby union player who plays fly-half for Super Rugby side . Burns played over 100 times for Gloucester between 2007–2014, and over 100 times for Leicester Tigers across two spells, he also represented Bath in Premiership Rugby. He has also played for Toyota Industries Shuttles in Japan. In June 2022 he kicked the winning drop goal in the final minute of the Premiership final for Leicester against Saracens.

Club career

Gloucester
On 6 June 2008 Burns was announced as part of the intake to Gloucester Rugby's academy, joining from Bath Rugby's academy.

On 30 June 2009 Gloucester Rugby announced that Burns was one of a number of academy players to sign senior contracts.

In January 2010 he re-signed with Gloucester, committing himself until the end of the 2011/12 season.

His contract was renewed in the Spring of 2012.

Burns came in for Gloucester in the game against Biarritz Olympique and got a conversion. In the next game he made his first start at fullback at Kingsholm against Australia. In this game he scored a try. In the following match he was once again selected at fullback and he scored two penalties against the Cardiff Blues. However next game Olly Morgan replaced Burns at fullback and Burns made a start at fly-half. Burns then scored all of his club's points with two converted tries. Burns has since played many games at fly-half and fullback, including an April 2010 performance against Saracens. In this game he was named the man of the match as a reward for his outstanding kicking from hand, goal kicking and composure under the high ball. The highlight of this match was when Burns chipped over a rushing Saracen defence allowing Charlie Sharples to score a vital try in the corner.

Leicester
Burns joined Leicester Tigers at the end of the 2013–14 season.

Bath
On 14 February 2017, Burns signed for hometown club Bath ahead of the 2017–18 season.

In a Champions Cup match on 13 October 2018, a blunder by Burns cost Bath their match against Toulouse. Having got behind the posts, Burns started to celebrate instead of immediately touching down for a try. However, a Toulouse player, Maxime Medard managed to knock the ball out of his hand.

Shokki Shuttles
On 1 May 2020 it was announced that Burns would leave Bath at the end of his contract to join Japanese side Toyota Jido Shokki.

Return to Leicester
Burns returned to Leicester Tigers ahead of the 2021–22 season. With George Ford called up for  Burns started every match for Leicester during February 2022 leading to him being awarded the Gallagher Player of the Month award. His drop goal in the 79th minute won Leicester the 2022 Gallagher Premiership final against Saracens and earned his first major title. Burns had earlier come on as a replacement for the injured George Ford.

Highlanders
On 22 January 2023, Leicester Tigers announced that the club had agreed terms with Burns for an early release from his contract with the club – effective from February 2023 – to allow him to continue his career in Super Rugby. The next day, the  announced that the franchise had signed Burns for the 2023 Super Rugby Pacific season.

International career
Burns represented his country at under 20 level and played in the 2010 IRB Junior World Championship in Argentina in 2010.

Burns represented England Saxons against Ireland and Scotland A, and his form earned him selection into the England EPS squad for the Barbarians game on 27 May 2012.

On 1 December 2012, Burns made his England debut, replacing Owen Farrell during the 38–21 victory over New Zealand, during which he scored his first international points with two penalties.
Burns joined the 2013 England tour and played at number 10 vs Argentina in both tests. He scored two penalties and three out of four conversions in the first game when the team won 32–3, and also scored his first England try. He started the first test against New Zealand at Eden Park in June 2014, kicking 12 points in a 20-15 England loss.

International tries

Personal life
Born in Bath Burns is a former pupil of Beechen Cliff School in the city. Burns is Irish-qualified by virtue of his paternal grandfather, Tommy, who was born in Dublin. 

In an interview with BT Sportat Silverstone Burns revealed he is named after Freddie Spencer the two time 500cc World Champion.

Honours

Gloucester
 Anglo-Welsh Cup: 2010-11

Leicester
 Premiership: 2021-22
 Anglo-Welsh Cup: 2016-17

References

External links
Leicester Tigers Profile

Living people
English rugby union players
1990 births
Gloucester Rugby players
Bath Rugby players
People educated at Beechen Cliff School
Rugby union fly-halves
England international rugby union players
Rugby union players from Bath, Somerset
Leicester Tigers players
English people of Irish descent
Toyota Industries Shuttles Aichi players
Highlanders (rugby union) players